Desmoncus is a genus of mostly climbing, spiny palms native to the Neotropics. The genus extends from Mexico in the north to Brazil and Bolivia in the south, with two species present in the southeastern Caribbean (Trinidad and the Windward Islands).

Description
Desmoncus is best known as a genus of climbing palms. Twenty-three of the 24 species recognised by Andrew Henderson in his revision of the genus are climbers; only one, D. stans is free-standing. Almost all Neotropical climbing palms belong to Desmoncus—the one exception being Chamaedorea elatior.

Desmoncus leaves are pinnately compound and are made up of a leaf sheath, petioles, rachis, and individual leaflets. The ends of the leaves are modified into a climbing structure called a cirrus. Instead of leaflets, the cirrus usually has grappling hook-like structures called acanthophylls; in some species the cirrus is less well developed and is almost absent in D. stans, the non-climbing species.

All parts of the leaves, including the leaflets themselves, are covered with spines.

Taxonomy 

John Dransfield and colleagues put Desmoncus in the subfamily Arecoideae, the tribe Cocoseae and the subtribe Bactridinae, together with Aiphanes, Acrocomia, Astrocaryum and Bactris.

The genus was described by Carl Friedrich Philipp von Martius in 1824. The first species described was D. polyacanthos. Martius later described six additional species that he placed in the genus. In this 1881 Flora Brasiliensis, Carl Georg Oscar Drude recognised 17 species. João Barbosa Rodrigues recognised 28 species in his 1903 work Setum Palmarum Brasiliensis.

Max Burret published a revision of the entire genus in 1934. Burret described nine new species and ended up recognising a total of 41 species. In the 1940s, Liberty Hyde Bailey added 14 additional species to the genus Desmoncus. Jan Wessels Boer rejected the species concept used by Bailey, Barbosa Rodrigues, and Burret as being too narrow and ended up recognising only seven species In his 2011 revision of the genus, Andrew Henderson recognised 24 species.

Distribution 
Desmoncus ranges from Mexico in the north to Bolivia and Brazil in the south. The species are mostly found in lowland tropical rainforest. Twelve species occur in Colombia, the most species-rich country, while 10 are found in Brazil.

Species
 Desmoncus chinantlensis Liebm. ex Mart. – southern Mexico and Central America (Veracruz to Nicaragua)
 Desmoncus cirrhifer A.H.Gentry & Zardini – Panama, Colombia, Ecuador
 Desmoncus costaricensis (Kuntze) Burret – Costa Rica
 Desmoncus giganteus  A.J.Hend. – Colombia, Ecuador, Peru, western Brazil
 Desmoncus horridus Splitg. ex Mart. – Trinidad, Venezuela, the Guianas, Colombia, Ecuador, Peru, Bolivia, Brazil 
 Desmoncus interjectus A.J.Hend. – Colombia
 Desmoncus kunarius de Nevers ex A.J.Hend. – Panama
 Desmoncus latisectus Burret – Bolivia
 Desmoncus leptoclonos Drude – Paraguay, Brazil
 Desmoncus loretanus A.J.Hend. – Loreto region of Peru
 Desmoncus madrensis A.J.Hend. – Peru
 Desmoncus mitis Mart. – Brazil, Bolivia, Peru, Ecuador, Colombia 
 Desmoncus moorei A.J.Hend. – Nicaragua, Costa Rica
 Desmoncus myriacanthos Dugand. – Panama, Colombia, Venezuela
 Desmoncus obovoideus A.J.Hend. – Panama
 Desmoncus orthacanthos Mart. – eastern Brazil
 Desmoncus osensis A.J.Hend. – Costa Rica
 Desmoncus parvulus L.H.Bailey – Venezuela, Colombia, northwestern Brazil, the Guianas 
 Desmoncus polyacanthos Mart. – Trinidad, Windward Islands, Venezuela, the Guianas, Colombia, Ecuador, Peru, Bolivia, Brazil 
 Desmoncus prunifer Poepp. ex Mart. – Loreto region of Peru
 Desmoncus pumilus Trail. – Colombia, northwestern Brazil
 Desmoncus setosus Mart. – Colombia, northwestern Brazil
 Desmoncus stans Grayum & Nevers – Costa Rica
 Desmoncus vacivus L.H.Bailey – Colombia, northwestern Brazil, Peru

References

 Carl Friedrich Philipp von Martius: The Book of Palms/Das Buch der Palmen/Le livre des palmiers, introduced by the editor H. Walter Lack, Taschen Verlag, Köln, Germany 2010 

 
Trees of the Caribbean
Trees of Central America
Trees of South America
Trees of Mexico
Arecaceae genera
Taxa named by Carl Friedrich Philipp von Martius